Anathallo was a band originally from Mt. Pleasant, Michigan and then based in Chicago, Illinois. The band started practicing in the fall of 2000 and played their first show soon afterward. Their name is derived from a Greek word meaning "to renew, refresh or bloom again."

Anathallo released Floating World, their first nationally distributed record, in 2006 through Sony/BMG. The band released a follow-up, entitled Canopy Glow, on Anticon in 2008.

History
Anathallo was formed in Mt. Pleasant, Michigan, in 2000. The band, led by singer and guitarist Matt Joynt, often consisting of seven or eight members, operated in a relentlessly DIY manner for the first six years of its existence, releasing three EPs (one independently, and two on Selah Records) one full-length album (Sparrows originally on Selah Records) and independently booking eighteen national tours between the years 2000 and 2006.

In 2006 the band independently released Floating World, a concept album based on a Japanese story called Hana-Saka-Jiji,. Soon after, the album was re-released with wider distribution through Sony/BMG. The album spawned several songs that were used in television commercials, including "Yuki! Yuki! Yuki!" in a Vick's ad, and "Dokkoise House (With Face Covered)" in an American Express commercial. The income from these licenses allowed the band a less stressful experience pursuing their follow-up album. The group relocated to Chicago, Illinois, and accepted an invitation to be artists-in-residence at Berry United Methodist Church where they began working on their follow-up LP, "Canopy Glow".

In 2008, Canopy Glow — which was recorded at Engine Studios by engineer/producer Neil Strauch — was released to critical acclaim in the US, EU, and Japan. Following the release of Canopy Glow, the band toured with an eclectic variety of artists including Sam Amidon, Brand New, Aloha, Page France, The Format, Dosh, Manchester Orchestra and Rainer Maria, played Austin City Limits, Coachella, and Lollapalooza, and shared the stage with Joanna Newsom, Broken Social Scene and Sufjan Stevens. The group toured in support of Canopy Glow with two headlining US tours, one tour of the UK, two European tours and two tours in Japan before going on hiatus in 2009.

On April 12, 2010, after a long silence from the band, member Bret Wallin addressed the inactivity on his personal blog:Many of you know me from a past life. One which included month-long van rides, small rooms in the back filled with bottled water, playing Tetris with a trailer and seven people's musical equipment, a dry hoodie over a sweat-filled shirt by the end of each night. So let's put it on the record. It's not as though we put a stake through Anathallo's vampire heart. It's more that we wandered the band back to rest, to let it sleep through the day. And whatever or whoever wakes up in its place, we'll see.

Band members

Final members
Matt Joynt – vocals, guitar, auxiliary percussion, piano
Bret Wallin – trombone, auxiliary percussion, vocals
Danny Bracken – guitar, auxiliary percussion, vocals
Seth Walker – bass, vocals
Jeremiah Johnson – drums, percussion, vocals 
Erica Walker – vocals, auxiliary percussion, autoharp
Jamie Macleod – piano, trumpet, auxiliary percussion, vocals

Former members
Andrew Dost - flugelhorn, piano, vocals, auxiliary percussion c d e 
Greg Leppert – trumpet 
Ken Fedor, auxiliary guitarist 
Joel Thiele – drums a b c d e
Nathan Sandberg – trombone, auxiliary percussion, piano, vocals a b c d e
Kevin Greenlees, The Jig – trombone, auxiliary percussion, vocals c d e
Glenn King – guitar, auxiliary percussion, vocals a b c d
Ty Forquer – drums, auxiliary percussion, keyboard a b

Discography

Albums

EPs

Other

References

External links
Official website
Anathallo on Purevolume

Indie rock musical groups from Michigan
Indie rock musical groups from Illinois
Musical groups from Chicago
Musical groups established in 2000
Anticon artists